Cairo English School (CES) is a member of Esol Education, formerly known as Educational Services Overseas Limited (ESOL). CES opened in 2006 in Cairo and provides British-based international education culminating in Cambridge International Education IGCSE exam and the A-Level and IB Diploma offered as alternatives in the Sixth Form, CES is accredited by the Council of International Schools (CIS), Middle States Association of Colleges and Schools (MSA), British Schools of the Middle East (BSME), and has been an International Baccalaureate (IB) school since April 2010.

Curriculum 
Early Years Foundation Stage (EYFS)
National Curriculum of England
International General Certificate of Secondary Education (IGCSE)
A-Levels
International Baccalaureate (IB) - IB DP

Accreditations 
 Middle States Association of Colleges and Schools (MSA)
 Council of International Schools (CIS)
 British Schools of the Middle East (BSME)
 British School Overseas (BSO)

Memberships 
 European Council of International Schools (ECIS)

References

External links 
 

Schools in Egypt
2006 establishments in Egypt
Educational institutions established in 2006